Tavolzhansky is a rural locality (a khutor) in Staroanninskoye Rural Settlement, Novoanninsky District, Volgograd Oblast, Russia. The population was 162 as of 2010. There are 4 streets.

Geography 
Tavolzhansky is located in forest steppe on the bank of the Buzuluk River, 29 km southwest of Novoanninsky (the district's administrative centre) by road. Durnovsky is the nearest rural locality.

References 

Rural localities in Novoanninsky District